Cawarral is a rural town and locality in the Livingstone Shire, Queensland, Australia. In the  the locality of Cawarral had a population of 831 people.

History 
Cawarral State School opened on 13 July 1874.

In the 2011 census, Cawarral had a population of 726 people.

In the  the locality of Cawarral had a population of 831 people.

Education 
Cawarral State School is a government primary (Prep-6) school for boys and girls at 125 Annie Drive.  In 2015, Cawarral State School had an enrolment of 87 students with 6 teachers (5 full-time equivalent). In 2018, the school had an enrolment of 85 students with 7 teachers (6 full-time equivalent) and 9 non-teaching staff (5 full-time equivalent).

There is no secondary school in Cawarral. The nearest secondary schools are Yeppoon State High School in Yeppoon to the north-east and Glenmore State High School in Kawana in Rockhampton to the south-west.

Facilities 

The Cawarral Cemetery is on the corner of Cemetery Road and Helena Lane and is managed by the Livingstone Shire Council.

References

External links 

 

Towns in Queensland
Shire of Livingstone
Localities in Queensland